The Beautiful South were an English pop rock group formed in 1988 by Paul Heaton and Dave Hemingway, two former members of the Hull group The Housemartins, both of whom performed lead and backing vocals. Other members throughout the band's existence were former Housemartins roadie Sean Welch (bass), Dave Stead (drums) and Dave Rotheray (guitar). The band's original material was written by Heaton and Rotheray.

After the band's first album, Welcome to the Beautiful South (1989, recorded as a quintet), they were joined by a succession of female vocalists. All of the following artists performed lead and backing vocals alongside Heaton and Hemingway – Briana Corrigan for albums two and three after appearing as a guest vocalist on one, followed by Jacqui Abbott for the fourth to seventh albums, and finally Alison Wheeler for the final three Beautiful South albums.

The group were known for their wry and socially observant lyrics. They broke up in January 2007, claiming the split was due to "musical similarities", having sold around 15 million records worldwide.

History

Formation
Paul Heaton and Dave Hemingway had initially come to attention as (respectively) the lead singer and "singing drummer" of the successful Hull jangle pop band The Housemartins, who had scored seven UK Top 40 singles and two Top 10 albums between 1986 and 1988. (Heaton was with the Housemartins for their entire existence; Hemingway joined in time for their second and final album.) The band was known for blending overt socialist politics and a form of Christianity, having baited the British monarchy, the building industry and South African apartheid in their songs as well as including gospel elements in their music. The Housemartins often claimed to have set a fixed lifespan for themselves, and the members duly brought the band to an end in 1988 at the height of its success. Heaton and Hemingway immediately began work on setting up a new band, naming it "The Beautiful South" as a sarcastic comment on their staunch Northern roots.

The third initial bandmember was Dave Rotheray, a songwriting guitarist who'd previously played with Hemingway in two other Hull bands, The Newpolitans and The Velvetones. At the time Rotheray was studying for a PhD at the University of Hull and living on Grafton Street, where Heaton also lived. Rotheray and Heaton became the songwriting team for The Beautiful South, which was conceived as a quintet with Heaton and Hemingway (who was no longer drumming) as the two lead singers. The core band was completed by Dave Stead (ex-Luddites/Vicious Circle) on drums, and former Housemartins roadie Sean Welch on bass guitar. Also important to the band's sound was studio keyboard player Damon Butcher — though never an official member of the group, he would end up playing virtually all the piano and keyboard parts on the band's albums.

Debut album release
Their first album Welcome to the Beautiful South was released in 1989, and promptly produced a Number 2 UK Singles Chart hit, "Song For Whoever". With the follow-up single "You Keep It All In" reaching number 8 and "I'll Sail This Ship Alone" reaching number 31, the band were soon set to equal or surpass the success of The Housemartins, while the songwriting built on and expanded the trenchant social critiques which the previous band had been known for (topics included nationalism, domestic violence, football hooliganism and the self-serving industry of love songs, and the album's disturbing cover art also drew attention). Northern Irish singer Briana Corrigan was featured as a background vocalist on the album. Her contributions proved so successful that she was soon promoted to full membership status, as the band's third vocalist.

Choke 
In 1990, the Beautiful South released their second album, Choke. Two singles—"My Book" and "Let Love Speak Up Itself"—charted outside the Top 40, but the album also provided the band's only Number 1 hit, a Hemingway/Corrigan duet called "A Little Time". The video, featuring the aftermath of a domestic fight, won the 1991 BRIT Award for Best Video.

Third album and Corrigan's departure
The band's third album 0898 Beautiful South followed in 1992. It provided another Top 20 hit in the shape of "Bell Bottomed Tear" as well as two further Top 30 hits, "Old Red Eyes Is Back" and "We Are Each Other", although a fourth single "36D" only placed in the Top 50. "We Are Each Other" also became the band's biggest hit in the United States, peaking at No. 10 on the Billboard Modern Rock Tracks chart in 1992.

Both Choke and 0898 Beautiful South illustrated the growing fullness of the band's sound. Both featured Pete Thoms and Gary Barnacle as regular contributors on brass and woodwind, and also featured Corrigan as lead vocalist on several tracks. Her contribution helped to characterise the bittersweet kitchen sink dramas played out in the band's often barbed songs, and allowed Heaton and Rotheray to explore and express female perspectives in their songwriting. However, the latter approach had mixed success, demonstrated later in 1992 when Corrigan chose to leave the band to pursue a solo career. Although her decision was partly prompted by a desire to record and promote her own material (which was not getting exposure within The Beautiful South), she had also had ethical disagreements over some of Heaton's lyrics, most notably "Mini-correct", "Worthless Lie" and the 0898 Beautiful South single "36D", which criticised the British glamour industry via scathing comments about glamour models. Five years later, Hemingway would admit "we all agree that we should have targeted the media as sexist instead of blaming the girls for taking off their tops".

Jacqui Abbott joins the group
In 1994, St Helens supermarket shop-worker Jacqui Abbott was brought on board to fill in as the new third lead vocalist for the band. Heaton had heard her sing at an after-show party in St Helens and remembered her vocal talents. Heaton referred to her as "the lass from the glass"—a reference to the Pilkington factory in St Helens. Abbott's first album with the band was Miaow in the same year. Hits included "Good as Gold (Stupid as Mud)" and a cover of Fred Neil's "Everybody's Talkin'", previously popularised by Harry Nilsson.

Carry On Up the Charts 
November 1994 saw the release of Carry On Up the Charts, a "best of" compilation consisting of the singles to date plus new track "One Last Love Song". Released at a time when the group's album sales had been waning, the album was a huge commercial success. It secured the Christmas number one spot on the charts and became the second-best selling album of the year. In 1995, the band was one of the support acts for R.E.M. on the British leg of their world tour. On this tour the band played an extra night when Oasis pulled out of their Huddersfield appearance. The Beautiful South played "Some Might Say" and dedicated it to any Oasis fans at the gig.

Blue Is the Colour 
The 1996 album Blue Is the Colour sold over a million copies, and featured hit singles "Rotterdam" and "Don't Marry Her". The album demonstrated the band's gradual shift towards a country music sound, and was well received by the public and on BBC and commercial radio. In 1997, the Beautiful South headlined stadium concerts for the first and last time, in Huddersfield and at Crystal Palace National Sports Centre in London. Support for the Huddersfield concert was provided by Cast and the Lightning Seeds.

Quench 
The album Quench (1998) was released with similar commercial success, again reaching number one in the UK album charts. "Perfect 10", the first single to be released from the album, also provided the band with further singles chart success. The album is also notable for being more uptempo, and being the first on which Heaton and Hemingway's former Housemartins colleague Norman Cook (Fatboy Slim) was used in a consultancy role.

Painting It Red release and Abbott's departure
Although 2000's Painting It Red album reached Number 2 in the UK charts, the band suffered difficulties in its promotion and in touring, and a substantial number of the CDs were faulty. Jacqui Abbott left the band in the same year, discouraged by the pressures of touring and needing to concentrate on looking after her son, who had just been diagnosed with autism. After completing their tour obligations, the band marked time with a second greatest-hits album (Solid Bronze) in 2001, and took time off to refresh themselves. Heaton embarked on a solo career under the Biscuit Boy (a.k.a. Crakerman) alias and released the Fat Chance album in 2001. It did not sell well, despite being critically acclaimed, and was reissued under Heaton's own name the following year.

Gaze 
The Beautiful South regrouped in 2003, with new recruit Alison Wheeler taking on the role of female singer. This lineup recorded Gaze in 2003, following it with 2004's Golddiggas, Headnodders and Pholk Songs, an album of unusually arranged cover tunes including "Livin' Thing", "You're The One That I Want", "(Don't Fear) The Reaper" and "I'm Stone in Love With You". One track from the album, "This Old Skin", was presented as a cover of a song by an obscure band called "The Heppelbaums"; it was later revealed to be an original Heaton/Rotheray composition.

Final album released
The final Beautiful South album Superbi was released on 15 May 2006. It was recorded at Peter Gabriel's Real World Studios, a farm in Bakewell and at producer Ian Stanley's studio in Enniskerry, County Wicklow. It was mixed by Bill Price (Sex Pistols, Clash, Guns N' Roses). Paul Heaton's hand is recognisable in quirky song titles such as "The Rose of My Cologne", "The Cat Loves The Mouse" and "Never Lost A Chicken to a Fox". The first single, "Manchester", started off as a poem—"If rain makes Britain great, then Manchester is greater"—"a sodden tribute" to the city in which he now lived, said Heaton.

Split
After a band meeting on 30 January 2007, they decided to split. They released a statement on 31 January 2007, in which they joked that their reasons for splitting were "musical similarities"—an ironic reference to "musical differences" which are often cited as the reason for a band's split. "The band would like to thank everyone for their 19 wonderful years in music", the statement also said.

In May 2007, the band's music was used in a jukebox musical entitled The Slide (book by Adrian Davis). It was premiered at the Wyvern Theatre, Swindon.

Discography

Welcome to the Beautiful South (1989)
Choke (1990)
0898 Beautiful South (1992)
Miaow (1994)
Blue Is the Colour (1996)
Quench (1998)
Painting It Red (2000)
Gaze (2003)
Golddiggas, Headnodders and Pholk Songs (2004)
Superbi (2006)

References

External links

Complete Discography
The Beautiful South at Discogs
 

English pop music groups
English rock music groups
English pop rock music groups
Musical groups established in 1988
Musical groups disestablished in 2007
Musical groups from Kingston upon Hull
Brit Award winners
1988 establishments in England
2007 disestablishments in England
Go! Discs Records artists